Woeng Nakhon Khasem is a market in the Samphanthawong District, Bangkok, Thailand. It is popularly known as the "Thieves Market" as formerly mostly stolen goods were sold there. The market is surrounded by Charoen Krung, Chakkrawat, Boriphat, and Yaowarat Roads in the area near foot of Damrong Sathit Bridge (Saphan Lek) with close to Wang Burapha and Khlong Thom. Its name  literally translated as "delightful townspeople alcove".

Woeng Nakhon Khasem regarded as the first shopping district in Bangkok that has it all. It occurred during the King Chulalongkorn (Rama V)'s reign. HM the King bestowed this land to Prince Paribatra Sukhumbandhu. In the year 1905, it was the site of the first cinema in Siam (now Thailand) in the name of a Japanese Cinema, due to being operated by Japanese, although it was just a temporary cinema that was roofed with zinc only. 

Later on, Woeng Nakhon Khasem became a market for imitation antiques, old furniture, brass ware, and records, with especially musical instruments. 

Talat Pi Raka (ตลาดปีระกา, "year of the rooster market") was another daily sub-market located within the area. It sells both fresh and dried foods and also used to be the location of renowned beef noodles shop.

Since 2012, the estate of the Paribatra family announced its plans to sell Woeng Nakhon Khasem, and ownership now lies with the Thai Charoen Corporation (TCC) by Charoen Sirivadhanabhakdi, which seeks to renovate it for commercialisation. The tenants of 440 units in the area will have to relocate to make room for development. Many shops have already closed down, and their front doors now bear signs detailing their new locations. 

In addition, Woeng Nakhon Khasem in every Tuesday to Sunday night at front of buildings of Sang Thong Machinery Limited Partnership near Wat Tuek Intersection, it is also the location street food stall, named "Khao Phad Pu Chang Phueak" or "Weng" that serves tasty crab fried rice, Hong Kong fried noodles and stir-fried fish maw with shark fin soup. The stall was chosen as one of the 2019 and 2020 Bangkok Bib Gourmand from Michelin Guide.

References

Retail markets in Bangkok
Samphanthawong district